Matthew Young may refer to:

 Matthew Young (bishop) (1750–1800), mathematician and Bishop of Clonfert
 Matthew Young (Australian footballer) (born 1972), Australian footballer who played with Hawthorn and St. Kilda
 Matthew Young (volleyball) (born 1981), volleyball player
 Matthew Young (civil servant) (1944–2015), British civil servant
 Matt Young (born 1958), former American Major League baseball player
 Matt Young (outfielder) (born 1982), baseball outfielder
 Matt Young (footballer, born 1994), English footballer
 Matt Young (footballer, born 2003), English footballer
 Matt Young, owner of Matt Young Motorsports
 Matty Young (born 1985), English football midfielder